Stian Lunder Ringstad (born 29 August 1991) is a Norwegian football defender who currently plays for Ullensaker/Kisa. He has previously played for Lillestrøm and Eidsvold Turn.

He hails from the tiny village Bodding near Haga, Nes, and was brought into the senior squad of Eidsvold Turn for the 2007 season. He could have made his debut in 2006, but the Football Association of Norway refused, citing that he was too young.

After the 2008 season he joined regional greats Lillestrøm. He played in the 2009 La Manga Cup, and made his Norwegian Premier League debut against Aalesunds FK in April 2009, in a 2-3 away loss.

Career statistics

Club

References

External links
 Ringstad stats in Altom Football

External links

1991 births
Living people
People from Akershus
Norwegian footballers
Norwegian expatriate footballers
Norway international footballers
Norway youth international footballers
Norway under-21 international footballers
Eliteserien players
Primeira Liga players
Norwegian First Division players
Lillestrøm SK players
S.C. Braga players
Strømsgodset Toppfotball players
Sandefjord Fotball players
FK Haugesund players
Ullensaker/Kisa IL players
Norwegian expatriate sportspeople in Portugal
Expatriate footballers in Portugal
Association football defenders
Sportspeople from Viken (county)